Montegaldella is a city in the province of Vicenza, Veneto, northern Italy. The highway SP16 runs through the town.

Main sights
The Villa Conti-Lampertico "La Deliziosa" (Delightful one) was built in the early 17th century; its garden features statues by Orazio Marinali. Like the nearby Montegalda, it is home to a castle.

San Michele Arcangelo is a 16th-century Roman Catholic church, restored in the early 2000s; the church's bells are still rung by hand by a team of citizens, who have also participated in bellringing contests.

References

Cities and towns in Veneto